Seyyed Khashan (also Romanized as Seyyed Khashān) is a village in Ahudasht Rural District, Shavur District, Shush County, Khuzestan Province, Iran. At the 2006 census, its population was 1,243, in 203 families.

References 

Populated places in Shush County